Manghera is a village in  Fatehabad District, Haryana. It is 21.2 kilometers from the main town Tohana, 40  kilometers from Fatehabad and 161 km from the state capital of Chandigarh.

Neighbouring Villages

Schools in Manghera

Government primary school Manghera

Colleges nearby Manghera

Apex polytechnic college
Surya College of Education
JBRD College, Uklana

References

External links

Villages in Fatehabad district